Tahaneh-ye Vosta (also Romanized as Ţahaneh-ye Vosţá and Ţahāneh-ye Vosţá) is a village in Sar Firuzabad Rural District, Firuzabad District, Kermanshah County, Kermanshah Province, Iran. At the 2006 census, its population was 75, in 16 families.

References 

Populated places in Kermanshah County